Petrolimex (PLX), formally the Vietnam National Petroleum Group, is an industry group in Vietnam. Besides working in petroleum and natural gas, the company has significant subsidiaries active in the fields of insurance, transport and trading. It, in competition with PetroVietnam (PVN), is Vietnam's leading oil and gas producing company. Company main offices are located in Ha Noi.

Activities 
Petrolimex caters oil-related products and services to Cambodia's domestic market. Beyond import/export and refining, Petrolimex is also active in the fields of engineering, installation, mechanical and oil equipment, insurance, banking.

Petrolimex operates 2,352 gas stations out of the 14,000 in operation in the country, with a focus on remote and distant areas. Everything in those gas stations -  lubricants, gas, insurance, banking - is produced and sold by Petrolimex' subsidiaries. Petrolimex account for 55% of Vietnam's oil-related imports, and lead the market with a 55% share of the oil products market.

Subsidiaries
Petrolimex group companies include:
 Petrolimex Joint Stock Insurance Company (PJICO)
 Petrolimex Gas JSC
 Petrolimex Petrochemical Corporation - JSC
 Petrolimex Tanker Corporation
 Petrolimex Concrete and Construction Co. Ltd
 Petrolimex Land Holdings JSC
 Petrolimex Group Commercial Joint Stock Bank (PG Bank)

History 
The Vietnam National Petroleum Corporation was initially created in January 1956 under the name Vietnam National Petroleum Corporation, set up by decree of the minister of commerce.

In July 2011, Petrolimex sold 2.56% of its shares in an IPO, raising $20 million, with the state still holding 94.99% of the capital.

In December 2015, Petrolimex (via its subsidiary Petrolimex Nepal) delivered its first batch of aviation fuel (39,800 litres).

In February 2016, Petrolimex admitted there was a large amount of toluene impurities in one of its A95 gasoline batch that caused multiple car breakdowns.

In May 2016, Nippon Oil officially became a 9.09% stockholder of Petrolimex, thus reducing the state ownership below 75%.

In 2016, in the wake of Brexit, Petrolimex planned to sell PJICO to a foreign fund, and to merge its real estate activity into its construction subsidiary. It also finalized the merger of the PG Bank with Vietinbank.

References

External links
Official site

 
Companies based in Hanoi
Non-renewable resource companies established in 1956
Oil and gas companies of Vietnam
Government-owned companies of Vietnam
Vietnamese brands
Vietnamese companies established in 1956